Mountain gum may refer to:

Eucalyptus cypellocarpa, also known as the mountain grey gum
Eucalyptus dalrympleana, also known as the mountain white gum